Moukda Souksavath (born 14 July 1989) is a Laotian football player who plays for Vientiane. He is a member of Laos national football team.

International goals
Scores and results list Laos' goal tally first.

References 

1989 births
Living people
Laotian footballers
Laos international footballers

Association footballers not categorized by position